Edgewater Generating Station is a 380 megawatt (MW) coal power plant located on the south side of Sheboygan, Wisconsin, on the shore of Lake Michigan, whose waters are used to provide cooling. It provides electricity for customers in the northeastern part of Alliant Energy's Wisconsin Power & Light service area and service to several local municipal utilities. In 2009, it was the seventh largest generating station in Wisconsin, with a net summer capacity of 767 MW.

Units

 
In 1952 one of the units was upgraded with a Babcock & Wilcox cyclone boiler. At the time, the facility was using a 50/50 mix of Illinois and West Virginia coal. The West Virginia coal was shipped via lake freighter from Lorain, Ohio.

At present, coal is delivered to the plant entirely by railroad, originating primarily from the Powder River Basin in Wyoming, via a Union Pacific spur line that was originally the main line of the Milwaukee Northern interurban railway.

Unit 3 and 4 share the same chimney.

Unit 3 turbine and generator were manufactured by Allis-Chalmers. Unit 4 was manufactured by General Electric, with an Alterrex excitation system. Unit 5 was also manufactured by General Electric, with a Generrex excitation system.

Retirement and decommissioning
Unit 3 was retired at the end of 2015 due to its age and efficiency. Unit 4 was retired in 2018 as Alliant Energy worked to reduce 80 percent of carbon dioxide emissions by 2050. Unit 4's electricity generation would be replaced by Riverside Energy Center in the Town of Beloit, which uses natural gas.

On May 22, 2020, Alliant Energy announced that the plant would be decommissioned by the end of 2022, and the property would be redeveloped for another use; Unit 5's generating capacity has also been replaced by a further expansion of Riverside. On June 23, 2022, Alliant announced that Edgewater's decommissioning date would be delayed until June 2025, due to the ongoing supply chain issues and to hedge against an energy shortage in upcoming years, with Edgewater mainly being in service during peak periods. The utility also plans a 99 MW battery by 2024.

Electricity generation 
In 2021, Edgewater generated 2,311 GWh, approximately 3.7% of the total electric power generated in Wisconsin (62,584 GWh) for that year. The plant had a 2021 annual capacity factor of 69.41%.

See also

 Alliant Energy
 List of power stations in Wisconsin

References

Energy infrastructure completed in 1931
Energy infrastructure completed in 1941
Energy infrastructure completed in 1951
Energy infrastructure completed in 1969
Energy infrastructure completed in 1985
Buildings and structures in Sheboygan, Wisconsin
Coal-fired power stations in Wisconsin
Alliant Energy